William Watson Clark (May 16, 1902 – March 4, 1972) born in St. Joseph, Louisiana, was a baseball pitcher for the Cleveland Indians (1924), Brooklyn Robins/Dodgers (1927–33 and 1934–37) and New York Giants (1933–34).

Clark finished 20th in voting for the 1931 National League MVP for having a 14–10 win–loss record, 34 games (28 started), 16 complete games, 3 shutouts, 2 games finished, 1 save, 233 innings pitched, 243 hits allowed, 86 runs allowed, 83 earned runs allowed, 4 home runs allowed, 52 walks, 96 strikeouts, 1 hit batsman, 3 wild pitches, 981 batters faced, 1 balk, 3.20 ERA and 1.264 WHIP. He led the National League in walks/9 IP in 1930 (1.71) and 1935 (1.22), innings in 1929 (279), games started in 1929 (36) and 1932 (36), hits allowed in 1929 (295), losses in 1929 (19) and batters faced in 1929 (1,189). He ranks 81st on the Major League Baseball career walks/9 IP list (1.97). He also holds the Dodgers single season record for walks/9 IP (1.22 in 1935).

In 12 seasons, he had a 111–97 win–loss record, 355 games (206 started), 91 complete games, 14 shutouts, 84 games finished, 16 saves, 1,747 innings pitched, 1,897 hits allowed, 836 runs allowed, 711 earned runs allowed, 86 home runs allowed, 383 walks allowed, 643 strikeouts, 17 hit batsmen, 21 wild pitches, 7,442 batters faced, 2 balks, 3.66 ERA and 1.305 WHIP.

As a hitter, Clark posted a .196 batting average (117-for-598) with 49 runs, 1 home run, 38 RBI and 33 bases on balls. Defensively, he was better than average, he recorded a .976 fielding percentage which was 16 points higher than the league average at his position.

Clark died at the age of 69 in Clearwater, Florida.

References

External links

1902 births
1972 deaths
Baseball players from Louisiana
Major League Baseball pitchers
Cleveland Indians players
Brooklyn Robins players
Brooklyn Dodgers players
New York Giants (NL) players
Minor league baseball managers
Mississippi College Choctaws baseball players
Peoria Tractors players
New Orleans Pelicans (baseball) players
Terre Haute Tots players
Minneapolis Millers (baseball) players
Reidsville Luckies players
People from St. Joseph, Louisiana